HMS Recruit was a 12-gun iron-hulled sailing brig of the Royal Navy, constructed by the Thames Ironworks and Shipbuilding Company and launched in 1846.

Recruit was the first iron-hulled vessel to be built for the Admiralty, and the Royal Navy's only iron-hulled sailing ship. She was sold back to her builders, Ditchburn and Mare on 28 August 1849, and was resold in 1852 to the General Screw Steam Shipping Company and converted into a screw steamer for the East Indian and Cape mail service, and renamed SS Harbinger.

References

Sources
 
 Lyon, David & Winfield, Rif (2004), The Sail and Steam Navy List: All the Ships of the Royal Navy 1815-1889. .
 

Brigs of the Royal Navy
Victorian-era naval ships of the United Kingdom
Ships built in Leamouth
1846 ships
Corvettes of the Royal Navy